Arturo García can refer to:

 Arturo García (cyclist, born 1946), Mexican cyclist
 Arturo García (Bolivian footballer) (born 1965), Bolivian footballer
 Arturo García (cyclist, born 1969), Mexican cyclist
 Arzu (footballer), born Arturo García Muñoz, Spanish footballer
 Arturo de Córdova, born Arturo García Rodríguez, Mexican actor
 Arturo Santos García, Mexican ophthalmologist and clinical researcher